Yengejeh (also known as Yangijah, Yengejeh-ye Sīnār, and YengīJeh) is a village in Mah Neshan Rural District, in the Central District of Mahneshan County, Zanjan Province, Iran. At the 2006 census, its population was 451, in 91 families.

References 

Populated places in Mahneshan County